Leucanopsis oruboides is a moth of the subfamily Arctiinae. It was described by Rothschild in 1909. It is found in Peru.

References

oruboides
Moths described in 1909